The 1954 Copa del Generalísimo Juvenil was the fourth staging of the tournament. The competition began on May 9, 1954, and ended on June 20, 1954, with the final.

First round

|}

Second round

|}

Third round

|}

Replay Game

|}

Quarterfinals

|}

Semifinals

|}

Final

|}

Copa del Rey Juvenil de Fútbol
Juvenil